The fiery flying serpent (Hebrew:  sārāf mə‘ōfēf) is a creature mentioned in the Book of Isaiah in the Tanakh.

The term translated as "fiery serpent", appears elsewhere in the Book of Isaiah to signify the seraphim, the singular form of which is also saraph.

Biblical accounts

Book of Isaiah
 Isaiah 6:2: "Above it stood the seraphim: each one had six wings; with twain he covered his face, and with twain he covered his feet, and with twain he did fly."
 Isaiah 14:29: "Do not rejoice, all you of Philistia, because the rod that struck you is broken; for out of the serpent's roots will come a viper, and its offspring will be a fiery flying serpent."
 Isaiah 30:6: "The burden against the beasts of the South. Through a land of trouble and anguish, from which came the lioness and the lion, the viper and the fiery flying serpent, they will carry their riches on the backs of young donkeys, and their treasures on the humps of camels, to a people who shall not profit."

Other sources
References to "fiery serpents" lacking a mention of flight can be found in several places in the Hebrew Bible.

  "Who led thee through that great and terrible wilderness, wherein were fiery serpents, and scorpions, and drought, where there was no water; who brought thee forth water out of the rock of flint;"
  "(6) And the LORD sent fiery serpents among the people, and they bit the people; and much people of Israel died. (7) Therefore the people came to Moses, and said, We have sinned, for we have spoken against the LORD, and against thee; pray unto the LORD, that he take away the serpents from us. And Moses prayed for the people. (8) And the LORD said unto Moses, Make thee a fiery serpent, and set it upon a pole: and it shall come to pass, that every one that is bitten, when he looketh upon it, shall live."  This symbol, the Nehushtan, is similar to the ancient Greek Rod of Asklepios (frequently confused with the caduceus) and is frequently cited as an instance of the same archetype.

Identification

Ancient Israelite seals often co-opted symbology from neighbouring ancient Egypt, and as such, archaeologists have discovered numerous seals which show a uraeus cobra with 4 wings. This, coupled with the fact that these cobras diverge from the typical Egyptian iconography which depicted them with only 2 wings, have been connected by some to the "fiery flying serpents" mentioned in Isaiah, or even to the more specific seraphim seen elsewhere in the text. This identification, however, is not universally accepted.

Assuming the fiery flying serpent to have a biological identification, Ronald Millett and John Pratt identify it with the Israeli saw-scale viper or carpet viper (Echis coloratus) based on several clues from the written sources, such as that the serpents inhabit the Arava Valley, prefer rocky terrain, and are deadly venomous. A Roman account dated 22 AD about the deserts of Arabia indicates the presence of the saw-scale viper, reporting that "there are snakes also of a dark red color, a span in length, which spring up as high as a man's waist, and whose bite is incurable." Other candidates include desert horned viper (and close relatives), the desert black snake or black desert cobra, and the nematode Dracunculiasis.

See also
Chalkydri
Dragon
Feathered Serpent
John 3
Seraph
Serpents in the Bible

References

Snakes in religion
Mythological monsters
Dragons
Animals in mythology
Serpents in the Bible
Book of Isaiah
Jewish legendary creatures